Wesley Klein (born 25 March 1988 in Leiderdorp, Netherlands) is a Dutch singer. He was mainly known for his participation in the Dutch version of the talent show Popstars on SBS 6 in its second series (2009–2010) in June 2009 in which he won on 29 January 2010.

Klein worked in construction until his talent was discovered by accident during a gig in a pub in 2005. He started playing gigs and taking part in local music festivals. After successfully auditioning for the Dutch Popstars in 2009, he went on to win the title, receiving a trophy and a record deal to release his debut single "You Raise Me Up", the winner's song sung by all four finalists. His version was released immediately after the finals and shot to No. 1 on the Dutch Single Top 100 chart dated 6 February 2010, staying at the top for two weeks. In May 2010, Klein performed at three sold out concerts at the Amsterdam ArenA with De Toppers. His debut album Vandaag en morgen (meaning "Today and Tomorrow" in Dutch) was released on 9 July 2010.

Klein is in a relationship with Nellie and they have a daughter together.

On 15 March 2012, Klein signed a contract with the record label Berk Music.

Discography

Albums 

|-
|align="left"|Vandaag en morgen||9 July 2010||17 July 2010||5||8||
|-
|align="left"|Onderweg||23 January 2016||30 January 2016||26||||
|}

Singles 

|-
|align="left"|"You Raise Me Up"||4 February 2010||13 February 2010||4||11|| No. 1 Single Top 100
|-
|align="left"|"Een ongelofelijke droom"||19 March 2010||3 April 2010||tip2||-|| No. 2 Single Top 100
|-
|align="left"|"Levenslang"||10 June 2010||-|||||| No. 16 Single Top 100
|-
|align="left"|"Een mooie dag"||2 September 2010||-|||||| No. 13 Single Top 100
|-
|align="left"|"Een vrolijk kerstfeest"||2 December 2010||-|||||| No. 36 Single Top 100
|}

References

External links
 

1988 births
Living people
Popstars winners
People from Leiderdorp
21st-century Dutch male singers
21st-century Dutch singers